Waldemar Henryk Starosta (born 14 July 1961 in Lipa, Oborniki County) is a Polish politician. He was elected to Sejm on 25 September 2005, getting 8391 votes in 8 Zielona Góra district as a candidate from the Samoobrona Rzeczpospolitej Polskiej list.

See also
Members of Polish Sejm 2005-2007

External links
Waldemar Starosta - parliamentary page - includes declarations of interest, voting record, and transcripts of speeches.

Members of the Polish Sejm 2005–2007
Self-Defence of the Republic of Poland politicians
1961 births
Living people